Jose Roman may refer to:
José Roman (boxer) (born 1946), boxer from Puerto Rico
José Román (baseball) (born 1963), baseball pitcher from the Dominican Republic
José Román Abreu, Puerto Rican politician and mayor of San Lorenzo

See also
Joe Roman, biologist